Rückersdorf is a municipality in the eastern part of the Thuringian landkreis of Greiz and belongs to the Verwaltungsgemeinschaft of Wünschendorf/Elster.

Geography

Neighboring Communities
Nearby municipalities are Braunichswalde, Hilbersdorf, Kauern, Linda bei Weida, Paitzdorf, and the City of Ronneburg in the Landkreis of Greiz; Heukewalde and Jonaswalde in the Landkreis of Altenburger Land; as well as the City of Crimmitschau in the Saxon Landkreis of Zwickauer Land.

Municipal divisions
The municipality consists of the villages Rückersdorf, Haselbach and Reust.

Culture and landmarks
Rückersdorf is part of the Diocese of Dresden-Meissen.

The municipality's Bismarck Tower, called the Reuster Turm, is located in Reust.  From the site there is a good view of the town and the surrounding countryside. The Reuster Turm is opened on the weekends from Easter to the end of October

Education
Rückersdorf is the location of its Verwaltungsgemeinschaft's elementary school.

References

Greiz (district)